Ivan Némethy (born 10 November 1946) is a Slovak sports shooter. He competed at the 1976 Summer Olympics and the 1980 Summer Olympics.

References

External links
 
 

1946 births
Living people
Slovak male sport shooters
Olympic shooters of Czechoslovakia
Shooters at the 1976 Summer Olympics
Shooters at the 1980 Summer Olympics
Sportspeople from Martin, Slovakia